Darwin Louis Cook (born August 6, 1958) is an American basketball coach and former player.

Playing career
Cook played for the University of Portland from 1976 to 1980, and was selected by the Detroit Pistons with 70th overall pick in the 1980 NBA draft.

Cook's NBA career lasted from 1980 to 1989, and he played for the New Jersey Nets, Washington Bullets, Denver Nuggets, and San Antonio Spurs. In 1987, he signed a one-year contract with Scavolini Pesaro of the Italian Serie A1 before returning to the NBA for one more season, playing for the Nuggets and the Spurs. After his NBA career, in 1989, he returned to Italy and signed a two-year contract with Scavolini.

Coaching career
On May 19, 2017, Cook was named a head coach of the University of Antelope Valley's Pioneers men's basketball team.

See also
 List of National Basketball Association single-game steals leaders

References

External links
 College & NBA stats @ basketballreference.com
 "Where Are They Now" – Darwin Cook by Talia Bargil @ nbrpa.com

1958 births
Living people
African-American basketball coaches
African-American basketball players
American expatriate basketball people in Italy
American men's basketball players
Basketball coaches from California
Basketball players from Los Angeles
Denver Nuggets players
Detroit Pistons draft picks
La Crosse Catbirds players
Lega Basket Serie A players
New Jersey Nets players
Point guards
Portland Pilots men's basketball players
Quad City Thunder players
San Antonio Spurs players
Victoria Libertas Pallacanestro players
Washington Bullets players
Crenshaw High School alumni
21st-century African-American people
20th-century African-American sportspeople